Pacy Ménilles Racing Club is a French football club based in Pacy-sur-Eure, Eure. It was founded in 1932. The club plays at the Stade Pacy-Ménilles, which has a capacity of 2,000. The colours of the club are blue and black.

Initially known as Pacy Vallée-d'Eure Football, the club faced financial difficulties following the departure of club president Gilles Caoudal during the 2010–11 season and on 2 July 2012, the club filed for bankruptcy with debts of €300,000. The club was relaunched as Pacy Ménilles Racing Club, taking the place of Pacy VEF's reserve side in Division d'Honneur, and reached the national amateur level again in 2017 after promotion to National 3.

Honours
 Normandie DH championship: 1994
 Championnat de France Amateurs Group A: 2008

References

Football clubs in France
Association football clubs established in 1932
1932 establishments in France
Sport in Eure
Football clubs in Normandy